McGraw or MacGraw is a surname of Irish and Scottish origin, and may refer to:

In acting:

 Ali MacGraw, American actress and model
 Charles McGraw, American actor
 Melinda McGraw, American actress

In politics:

 Darrell McGraw, lifelong West Virginian and a Democratic politician
 John McGraw (governor), Republican Governor of Washington state from 1893 to 1897
 Perrin H. McGraw (1822–1899), New York politician
 Warren McGraw, long serving politician and trial lawyer in West Virginia

In fiction:

 Feathers McGraw, fictional character
 Kit McGraw, British detective on FX Networks' Nip/Tuck
 Quick Draw McGraw, fictional cartoon character

In literature:

 Eloise McGraw, author of children's books
 Gary McGraw, co-author of five best selling books
 Jay McGraw, American author of self-help books, son of Phil McGraw (Dr. Phil)

In music
 Tim McGraw (born 1967), American country musician

In sports:

 Allan McGraw, Scottish football player and manager and father of Mark McGraw
 John McGraw (1873–1934), American Hall of Fame baseball player and manager
 Mark McGraw, Scottish football player and son of Allan McGraw
 Muffet McGraw (born 1955), American women's basketball coach
 Thurman "Fum" McGraw, football player
 Tom McGraw, former Major League Baseball pitcher
 Tug McGraw (1944–2004), American baseball player and father of Tim McGraw

In business

 James H. McGraw, co-founder of The McGraw-Hill Companies and president of the company from 1917 to 1928
 Harold McGraw III, current chairman, president & CEO of The McGraw-Hill Companies and great-grandson of its co-founder, James H. McGraw

In other fields:

 Jennie McGraw, daughter of John McGraw
 John McGraw (merchant), New York lumber tycoon
 John McGraw (brigadier general)
 Myrtle Byram McGraw (1899–1988), American psychologist
 Phil McGraw (born 1950), American psychologist and TV personality
 Thomas "Tam" McGraw (1952–2007), Scottish fugitive

See also
 McGrath (disambiguation)
Clan McGrath

References

Anglicised Irish-language surnames

de:McGraw